The Pueblo Bulls are a junior ice hockey team in the United States Premier Hockey League (USPHL). The Bulls play their home games at the Pueblo Ice Arena beginning with the 2019–20 season.

History
The Pueblo Bulls were announced by the Western States Hockey League (WSHL) as an expansion team on September 20, 2018. They began play in the 2019–20 season.

In 2020, the Bulls left the WSHL after one season and joined the United States Premier Hockey League (USPHL) Premier Division.

Season-by-season records

References

External links
 Pueblo Bulls website
 USPHL website

Sports in Pueblo, Colorado
Ice hockey teams in Colorado
Ice hockey clubs established in 2019
2019 establishments in Colorado